Om Jai Jagdish Hare is a Hindu religious song written by Pandit Shardha Ram Phillauri. It is a Hindi-language composition dedicated to god Vishnu and is mostly sung in Vishnu temples. The prayer is sung by the entire congregation at the time of Aarti.

History
It may have been inspired by the Dashavatara section of Gita Govinda of Jayadeva, a lyrical composition of 12th century, which has the same refrain:

There are also variants of the song, using the same tune and structure, but with focus on different deities. These include Om Jai Lakshmi Mata, Om Jai Shiva Omkara and Om Jai Shiva Shakti Hare.

Lyrics

Popular culture

 In the 1952 movie, Anand Math, the Govinda damodar Stotram of Sri BilvaMangala Thakura is adapted with the Jai Jagdish Hare refrain.(video search)
 In Purab Aur Paschim (1970), the prayer symbolizes the continuity of the Indian tradition before and after India's independence.(video search)
 In the 2001 movie, Freddy Got Fingered, the prayer is chanted at 24:45.
 The prayer inspired the movie "Om Jai Jagadish" in 2002.
 In the Movie "Baghban (2003 film)", as a prayer (Aarti) "Om Jai Jagdish" in the voice of Udit Narayan & Sneha Pant.

References

External links 
 

Hindu music
Aarti
Puja (Hinduism)
Hindu devotional songs